Transmission EP is an EP by the indie rock band Low. It was released in 1996 on Vernon Yard Recordings. The title track is a cover of the classic song "Transmission" by Joy Division.

Track listing
"Transmission" (Joy Division cover) – 6:15
"Bright" – 3:55
"Caroline 2" – 4:41
"Hands" – 4:30
"Jack Smith" (Supreme Dicks cover) – 16:11
 The song "Jack Smith" ends at 1:25. An untitled hidden track starts at 6:20.

References

1996 EPs
Albums produced by Steve Albini
Low (band) EPs